A NuFX archive is an archive file format that supports lossless data compression. It is usually given the file extension SHK; SDK may also be used to specify that the archive describes the entire contents of a disk.

History 
Andy E. Nicholas designed the format as an improved replacement for the Binary II (.BNY) format, adding compression. He introduced it alongside a pkzip-like program called ShrinkIt for Apple II systems, which he later migrated to the Apple IIGS as GS-Shrinkit.

The specification was republished by Apple in its File Type Notes.

See also 
 Comparison of file archivers
 Comparison of archive formats
 List of archive formats
 LZW

References 

Archive formats